Maha Dewi (1322 –  1392) was princess-regent of Hanthawaddy for about ten weeks at the end of her brother King Binnya U's reign. She was also governor of Dagon from 1364 to  1392.

Prior to her brief reign as regent, she had been a close adviser of her brother since 1369, and the de facto ruler of the kingdom since the early 1380s. But she never gained the support of the court. Powerful factions of the court used her alleged long-term affair with her much younger nephew-in-law Smim Maru to undermine her influence. When her nephew and adopted son Binnya Nwe raised a rebellion in 1383, Chief Minister Zeik-Bye secretly sided with Nwe.

Her ailing brother formally handed her power in October 1383. She could not defeat Nwe's rebellion. After Binnya U's death two months later, the court chose Nwe, who ascended the throne with the title of Razadarit. The new king reappointed his adoptive mother to her old post at Dagon but purely in a ceremonial role.

Early life
She was born Mwei Na to Princess Sanda Min Hla, and Prince Saw Zein. Her parents were first cousins. At birth, she received the title Wihara Dewi because she was born during the construction of a monastery donated by her father. Na had two full siblings: an elder sister Mwei Ne, and a younger brother Binnya U. Since her younger brother was born in 1323/24, Na was born in or before 1322. Shortly after her birth, her father became king of Martaban. Na became the king's eldest surviving child as Ne died young. The king gave Na the title "Maha Dewi", the name by which she would be known.

The two siblings became fatherless in 1330 when Saw Zein died. The young royals remained important as their powerful mother placed two successive kings and made herself their chief queen until 1348.

Princess of Dagon
The princess remained unmarried well into her mid-twenties. In 1348, Binnya U ascended the Martaban throne, and made his sister marry Bon La, son of the powerful minister Than-Daw in a marriage alliance. The new king also made Bon La governor of Dagon (modern central Yangon) with the title of Bya Hta-Baik. In the following years, her husband became an important ally of her brother. In 1362, Binnya U raised the Shwedagon Pagoda in Dagon to 20 meters (66 feet).

It was also the last year of peace in the kingdom. In 1363, while the king and his retinue were away from the capital Martaban (Mottama), a rival faction led by Prince Byattaba seized the throne. Byattaba's brother Laukpya also raised a rebellion in the Irrawaddy delta. The king sent Bya Hta-Baik with an army to retake the capital. But the commander was killed by poison by Byattaba's wife and Maha Dewi's younger half-sister Tala Mi Ma-Hsan during truce negotiations.

Maha Dewi had little time to mourn. Her brother quickly married her off to Zeya Thura, governor of Hmawbi, whom he had appointed as the next commander-in-chief. But Zeya Thura died in action soon after in the subsequent attack on Martaban. After Zeya Thura's death, Binnya U appointed her governor of Dagon.

Governor of Dagon
Maha Dewi proved an able governor. She became a much needed ally to her brother, who was now based out of Donwun, about 100 km north of Martaban. Her effective control of Dagon provided a backstop to Laukpya's forces from coming into the central Pegu province (modern Yangon Region and southern Bago Region). Smim Than-Byat, a brother of Byattaba and Laukpya but loyal to Binnya U, successfully defended the Pegu province from Laukpya's attacks from the west. But things turned for worse in 1369/70. That year, Byattaba's forces drove out Binnya U from Donwun. Binnya U's territory was now reduced to the Pegu province alone. He moved the capital to Pegu (Bago), about 60 km northeast of Dagon.

Power broker at Pegu
Her power grew even as her brother's domain shrank. The king, after the death of his trusted chief minister Pun-So in 1369, came to rely on his sister for advice. When Gov. Than-Byat of Syriam switched sides, it was Maha Dewi that planned the counterattack. She appointed Gen. Yawga Rat and Smim Maru to retake Syriam, across the river from her fiefdom of Dagon. The operation was successful, and Binnya U held on to the Pegu province.

Her rise however was not universally accepted. A court faction led by Chief Minister Zeik-Bye surreptitiously opposed her. The opposition became stronger about three years later when the princess, now in her 50s, allegedly became involved with a much younger Maru, who was the husband of Binnya U's daughter (and her niece) Tala Mi Thiri. The affair became public, and the people of Pegu began ridiculing her. The chronicle Razadarit Ayedawbon reports two supposedly contemporary verses which in vivid language strongly disparage the princess for having a scandalous "home-wrecking" affair at an old age with a younger married man. The affair reportedly is the source of the Mon proverb: "The old peahen climbs up a tree to lay a clutch of eggs; the old woman brazenly steals another woman's husband."

At any rate, she retained her brother's trust. He handed her more power over the years as his health continued to deteriorate. Jockeying for power became more fierce. More factions now allied themselves with the princess and Maru. The Maha Dewi–Maru faction was firmly in power by the early 1380s when the king's health rapidly declined. By 1382, she was the de facto ruler. The main opposition to her rule would come from her nephew and adopted son Binnya Nwe in 1383.

Rebellion by Binnya Nwe
The princess had adopted Binnya U's son Binnya Nwe since his birth. (The mother Queen Mwei Daw died soon after giving birth to him.) Maha Dewi had raised him like her own son who was never his father's favorite. Indeed, the king deemed him "ruthless", and once told his sister that Nwe was not to ascend the throne. (The king had chosen the younger son Baw Ngan-Mohn as heir-apparent.) Nwe responded in kind. In 1382, he eloped with his half-sister Tala Mi Daw much to the chagrin of their ailing father. The young couple was soon caught and Nwe was imprisoned. Maha Dewi had to repeatedly plead with her brother to free Nwe, and allow the young couple to be married. Her brother finally relented; she wedded the young couple.

It was all for naught. By then, Nwe as well as Ngan-Mohn had come to consider Maha Dewi as the enemy, believing that she would put her lover on the throne instead. Zeik-Bye had been instigating; he had warned Nwe that Maha Dewi and Maru were plotting to arrest him. By 22 April 1383, Nwe had decided to revolt. In the wee hours of 5 May 1383, Nwe and his 30 men fled to Dagon, and seized the governor's residence at Dagon.

At first, she did not make much of the "rebellion". The ailing king was more annoyed, and asked his sister to handle the situation. She thought about sending a battalion. But Zeik-Bye advised against it, characterizing the insurrection as a harmless exercise by a restless teenager. She agreed and instead sent a delegation to Dagon, asking Nwe to come back. Nwe sent back a conciliatory letter, saying that he still regarded her as his mother, and that he would soon return by August.

But he never planned to. He went on recruiting local governors around Dagon to come over to his side. On 18 August 1383, she sent another delegation. Nwe again told the envoys that he would soon return. Shortly after, she received news that Nwe had sent missions to enlist help from Martaban and Myaungmya. She rushed her own delegations to the nominal vassals. On 27 August 1383, she decided to use force at the end of the rainy season.

Regency

Meanwhile, Binnya U's health deteriorated markedly. He could not even attend meetings with the court anymore. In October, he officially handed power to his sister, giving her the right to raise the white umbrella, a symbol of Burmese sovereigns. The act formalized what had been the reality for sometime. She was now referred to as Min Maha Dewi ("Queen Maha Dewi"). However, she continued to refer to her brother as the sovereign in her official edicts.

Her first order was to retake Dagon. She had appointed Maru to lead the vanguard force, and Zeik-Bye the rearguard. On 28 October 1383, three armies—from Pegu, Martaban and Myaungmya—left for Dagon. Martaban and Myaungmya, which were nominal vassals, sent their armies mainly to monitor the situation. Nwe had already made several defensive preparations based on Zeik-Bye's reports. The three armies set up camp outside Dagon but could not agree on a coordinated plan. Meanwhile, Nwe sent envoys to Myaungmya and Martaban camps that the fight was strictly between him and Maha Dewi. The missions worked. The Myaungmya army first turned back, followed by the Martaban force a few days later. On 19 November 1383, Nwe moved in on Maru's vanguard army. With Zeik-Bye's rearguard staying clear of the fight, Maru was driven back.

Suddenly, it was her regime that was in trouble. She could not comprehend how Nwe's small band of men could have defeated the Pegu army. But she also realized from the open bickering between Zeik-Bye and Maru that she was in no position to organize another attack. She ordered an immediate upgrade of Pegu's moats and fortified walls. Zeik-Bye meanwhile kept Nwe apprised of the developments. By then, her authority was too weak. When Nwe and his small army appeared outside Pegu's walls on 10 December 1383, she could do nothing other than hunker down inside the city walls.

The stalemate ended with Binnya U's death on 2 January 1384. Maru tried to rally the court but found no support. When he and his wife tried to flee, they were captured. On 4 January 1384, the Zeik-Bye-led court handed the power to Nwe. The next day, Nwe ascended the throne with the title of Razadarit. The new king decided not to punish his adoptive mother. He reappointed her to her post at Dagon but strictly in a ceremonial role.

Last years
Maha Dewi lived out her last years at Dagon. She was not part of Razadarit's regime. In the next seven years, she saw her adopted son not only reunite the three Mon-speaking regions by force but also successfully withstand three invasions by the northern Ava Kingdom.

She died  1392. In 1394, Razadarit gave his newborn daughter Shin Sawbu the title of Wihara Dewi, the same title his adoptive mother was given at birth over seven decades earlier.

Ancestry
Below is her ancestry according to the chronicle Razadarit Ayedawbon.

Notes

References

Bibliography
 
 
 
 
 
 

Burmese monarchs
Hanthawaddy dynasty
14th-century women rulers
Burmese people of Mon descent